Octopus oliveri, is a species of octopus found in the western Pacific Ocean off the coast of Japan, Hawaii, and Kermadec Island, in reefs and boulder coasts.

It is a small species, roughly 70-260mm in length. Females will take longer to mate, the larger their body size. Afterwards, ~5000 eggs will hatch in about five weeks after being laid, and the male/female ratio seems unaffected by temperature. These eggs are laid in strings attached to a hard substrate.

References 

 Norman M.D. & Hochberg F.G. (2005) The current state of Octopus taxonomy. Phuket Marine Biological Center Research Bulletin 66:127–154
 Norman M.D., Finn J.K. & Hochberg F.G. (2014). Family Octopodidae. pp. 36–215, in P. Jereb, C.F.E. Roper, M.D. Norman & J.K. Finn eds. Cephalopods of the world. An annotated and illustrated catalogue of cephalopod species known to date. Volume 3. Octopods and Vampire Squids. FAO Species Catalogue for Fishery Purposes [Rome, FAO]. 4(3): 353 pp. 11 pls.
 Spencer, H.G., Marshall, B.A. & Willan, R.C. (2009). Checklist of New Zealand living Mollusca. pp 196–219. in: Gordon, D.P. (ed.) New Zealand inventory of biodiversity. Volume one. Kingdom Animalia: Radiata, Lophotrochozoa, Deuterostomia. Canterbury University Press, Christchurch.

Octopodidae
Molluscs described in 1998
Fauna of Japan
Fauna of Hawaii